Oru Sayahnathinte Swapnam is a 1989 Indian Malayalam film, directed by Bharathan. The film stars Suhasini, Madhu, Mukesh and Nedumudi Venu. The film has musical score by Ouseppachan.

Plot
The film tells the story of the inmates of an old age home called Snehalayam and Captain Alice Cherian, who comes there for work.

Cast
 
Suhasini as Capt. Alice Cherian
Madhu as Brigadier R. K. Menon
Mukesh as Roy Mathew
Nedumudi Venu as Dr. Kuriakose
Jagathi Sreekumar as Stephan
Thikkurisi Sukumaran Nair as Govinda Pillai
Sankaradi as Pisharadi
Bahadoor as Kunju Krishna Kaimal
Kalpana as Thankamani
Kaviyoor Ponnamma as Mariamma
Adoor Bhawani as Veronica
Aranmula Ponnamma as Saraswathiamma
Philomina
Meena
Ravi Vallathol as Kunju Krishna Kaimal's son

Soundtrack
The music was composed by Ouseppachan.

References

External links
  
 

1989 films
1980s Malayalam-language films
Films scored by Ouseppachan
Films directed by Bharathan